David Broncano Aguilera (born 30 December 1984) is a Spanish comedian and television host. He has also worked in news and advertising agencies.

In 2017, he was awarded the "Jaén, Paraíso Interior" award by the Provincial Council of Jaén. Furthermore, he won two Ondas Awards for the program La Vida Moderna (The Modern Life) in the category of Best National Radio Program in 2018 and for the late night show La Resistencia in the category of Best Light Entertainment Program on Television in 2019.

Since 2018, he hosts, with Ricardo Castella, the late night television show La Resistencia, on Movistar+. The first season finished on 5 July 2018.

Career 

In 2008, he began as a stand-up comedian at Paramount Comedy. In 2011 he began working as a collaborator in the program Hoy por hoy, on Cadena SER, with a section called Broncano's Questions. He has appeared on  since 2013. His real success came on the radio, essentially on the shows Yu: No te pierdas nada and Anda ya. He achieved greater success as of 2014 with the program La vida moderna, on Cadena SER, which he directed together with Ignatius Farray and Quequé, and for which they won the Ondas award for best radio program in 2018.

Television

Radio

References

External links

 
 

Spanish male comedians
Spanish television personalities
1984 births
Living people
Spanish stand-up comedians